Shafiq, Shafik, Shafeeq, Shafeeg, Shafique, Shafic, Chafiq, Chafic or Shafeek (Arabic: شفيق, Urdu: شفیق) is an Arabic name that may refer to
Given or middle name
Shafeeq (actor), Indian actor
Shafic Abboud (1926–2004), Lebanese painter
Shafiq Ades (1900–1948), Iraqi-Jewish businessman
Shafiq Ahmed (born 1949), Pakistani cricketer 
Shafique Ahmed (born 1937), Bangladeshi politician
Shafiq al-Hout (1932–2009), Palestinian politician and writer 
Shafik Assad (1937–2004), Israeli Arab politician, member of the Knesset for the Democratic Movement for Change, the Democratic Movement, Ahva and Telem, 1977–1981
Shafiq Badr (died 2013), Lebanese politician 
Shafiq Chitou (born 1985), Beninese boxer 
Shafik Chokin (1912–2003), the most recognized Kazakh scientist in the energy sector
Shafeeq Faruk, Singaporean footballer
Shafiq Fayadh, Syrian military commander 
Shafik Handal (1930–2006), Salvadoran politician
Shafik Hout (1932–2009), Palestinian politician and writer
Shafiq Husayn, American hip hop artist from the group Sa-Ra
Shafique Khan (born 1968), Indian musician 
Shafeek Nader (1926–1986), American activist
Shafiq Qaadri (born c. 1963), Canadian politician 
Shafiq Rasul (born 1977), British detainee in the U.S., part of the Tipton Three
Shafiq Sharif (born 1990), Malaysian cricketer 
Shafiq Syed (born 1976), Indian actor 
Shafiq Tuhin, Bangladeshi lyricist 
Shafique Virani, Professor of Islamic Studies at the University of Toronto
Shafik Wazzan (1925–1999), the Prime Minister of Lebanon from 1980 until 1984
Shafiqullah (disambiguation), multiple people
Shafiq ur Rahman (disambiguation), multiple people 
Omar Shafik Hammami (1984–2013), American citizen, leader of the Somali Islamist militant group al-Shabaab

Surname:
Ahmed Shafik (born 1941), Egyptian politician and a former candidate for the presidency of Egypt
Ahmed Shafik (sexologist), Egyptian researcher whose studies centre on human sexual physiology and associated reflexes
Ali Shafiq (born 1996), Pakistani cricketer 
Asad Shafiq (born 1986), Pakistani cricketer 
Azadeh Shafiq (1951–2011), Iranian royalty 
Azhar Shafiq (born 1973), Pakistani cricketer 
Chahryar Shafik (1945–1979), the son of Princess Ashraf Pahlavi, twin sister of the Shah of Iran, and Ahmad Shafiq
Dino Shafeek (1930–1984), Bangladeshi actor 
Doria Shafik (1908–1975), feminist, philosopher, poet and editor, and one of the principal leaders of the women's liberation movement in Egypt in the mid-1940s
Ivan Shafiq, Pakistani Pashto music composer, songwriter, music producer, musician and philanthropist 
Izzdin Shafiq (born 1990), Singaporean footballer 
Mohammad Shafiq (disambiguation), several people
Nasir Shafiq (born 1974), Malaysian cricketer 
Nemat Shafik, DBE, Deputy Governor of the Bank of England with responsibility for markets and banking, Member of the Bank of England Monetary Policy Committee
Norhalis Shafik, Singaporean football Defender
Shaheen Shafiq, Pakistani politician 
Shahriar Shafiq (1945–1979), Iranian royalty
Shawqi Shafiq (born 1955), Yemeni poet and translator
Viola Shafik, Egyptian-German film theorist, curator, and filmmaker

Arabic-language surnames
Arabic masculine given names
Urdu-language surnames
Pakistani masculine given names